The A122 highway is a highway in Nigeria. It is one of the east-west roads linking the main south-north roads. (It is named from the two highways it links).

It runs from the A1 highway at Ibadan, the capital of Oyo State to the A2 highway at Benin City, Edo State. The main towns on the route are Gbongan, Ilesa, Akure and Owo.

References

Highways in Nigeria